Reversal of Fortune is a 2003 South Korean film directed by Park Yong-woon, and starring Kim Seung-woo and Ha Ji-won. The film features several songs from Ha Ji-won's debut album, Homerun.

Plot 
Having turned his back on a promising career as a professional golfer, Kang Seung-wan is now a down on his luck stock exchange worker, and in debt to local gangster Ma Kang-sung. After crashing his car while driving through a tunnel, Seung-wan wakes up to find himself in an alternate reality where he fulfilled his sporting ambitions, and is now a famous golf champion. But things aren't as perfect as they first seem; he now has a wife who wants a divorce, and must compete in a major golf tournament despite not having played for over ten years.

Cast 
 Kim Seung-woo ... Kang Seung-wan
 Ha Ji-won ... Han Ji-yeong
 Kang Sung-jin ... Dae-shik
 Lee Moon-sik ... Ma Kang-sung
 Ko Ho-kyeong ... Seon-joo
 Im Chang-jung ... Police officer
 Park Kwang-jeong
 Im Yoo-jin

References

External links 
 
 
 Reversal of Fortune at HanCinema

2000s sports comedy films
2003 romantic comedy films
2003 films
Golf films
2000s Korean-language films
South Korean romantic comedy films
South Korean sports comedy films
2000s South Korean films